Vika Mpisane is a business executive with extensive experience in the Internet sector and the general field of information communication technologies in South Africa and globally. He has extensive experience in policy development, business and sector transformation, strategy development, stakeholder relations, regulation and project management. His previous roles include serving a chief executive officer of ZADNA, from which position his employment was terminated due to misconduct. member of the board of directors of Africa Top Level Domains, and ICANN ccNSO Councillor. He was most recently a member of the board of directors of Afrinic until he failed to secure re-election in July 2021.

Termination from ZADNA and term at Afrinic
Mpisane was terminated from his employment at ZADNA. Protracted disciplinary proceedings during which time Mpisane continued to receive remuneration while suspended ended with his being found guilty of misconduct and thereafter terminated from employment.
While suspended from his position at ZADNA he was elected to complete a term on the board of directors of Afrinic representing the Southern Africa region. At a subsequent re-election in 2021 he was unsuccessful.

References

External links 
 Profile on the ccNSO website
 Vika Mpisane - CEO: ZADNA, iWeek

South African business executives
Living people
Year of birth missing (living people)
University of KwaZulu-Natal alumni
South African fraudsters